Deacons for Defense is a 2003 American television drama film directed by Bill Duke. The television film stars Forest Whitaker, Christopher Britton, Ossie Davis, Jonathan Silverman, Adam Weiner, and Marcus Johnson. Based on a story by Michael D'Antonio, the teleplay was written by Richard Wesley and Frank Military.

The film is loosely based on the activities of the Deacons for Defense and Justice in 1965 in Bogalusa, Louisiana. The African-American self-defense organization was founded in February 1965 as an affiliate of the founding chapter in Jonesboro, Louisiana, to protect activists working with the Congress for Racial Equality (CORE), others advancing the Civil Rights Movement, and their families. Bogalusa was a company town, developed in 1906–1907 around a sawmill and paper mill operations. In the 1960s, the area was dominated by the Ku Klux Klan. During the summer of 1965, there were frequent conflicts between the Deacons and the Klan.

Plot
Marcus Clay (modeled on Bob Hicks) organizes an all-black group dedicated to patrolling the black section of town and protecting residents from "white backlash" in 1965. Activists continue the struggle to gain social justice after passage of the Civil Rights Act of 1964 ending legal racial segregation.

Main cast

 Forest Whitaker as Marcus Clay
 Ossie Davis as Reverend Gregory
 Christopher Britton as William Chase
 Jonathan Silverman as Michael Deane
 Tyrone Benskin as Archie
 Paul Benjamin as Otis
 Melanie Nicholls-King as Rose Clay
 Adam Weiner as Charles Hillibrand
 Gene Mack as TJ
 Mpho Koaho as Baily
 Rufus Crawford as Deacon
 Brian Paul as Holden
 Timothy Burd as Lester Conley
 David Black as Alphin
 Marcus Johnson as Young Marcus
 Joe Bostick as City Attorney
 Francis X. McCarthy as Judge Christenberry
 Shawn Corbett as Federal Agent
 Matt Birman as Rioter
 Craig Eldridge as US Attorney
 Patricia Shirley as Church Singer
 Sharon Riley as Church Singer
 Quancetia Hamilton as Woman

References

External links
 

2003 drama films
2003 television films
2003 films
English-language Canadian films
Canadian drama television films
American drama television films
Civil rights movement in film
Films directed by Bill Duke
Films about the Ku Klux Klan
Films set in 1965
Films set in Louisiana
African-American films
Black Canadian films
African-American drama films
2000s American films
2000s Canadian films